The RoboCup 2D Simulated Soccer League is the oldest of the RoboCup Soccer Simulation Leagues.  It consists of a number of competitions with computer simulated soccer matches as the main event.

There are no physical robots in this league but spectators can watch the action on a large screen, which looks like a giant computer game. Each simulated robot player may have its own play strategy and characteristic and every simulated team actually consists of a collection of programs. Many computers are networked together in order for this competition to take place.

Rules
In the 2D Simulation League, two teams of eleven autonomous software programs (called agents) each play soccer in a two-dimensional virtual soccer stadium represented by a central server, called SoccerServer. This server knows everything about the game, i.e. the current position of all players and the ball, the physics and so on. The game further relies on the communication between the server and each agent. On the one hand each player receives relative and noisy input of his virtual sensors (visual, acoustic and physical) and may on the other hand perform some basic commands (like dashing, turning or kicking) in order to influence its environment.

The big challenge in the Simulation League is to conclude from all possible world states (derived from the sensor input by calculating a sight on the world as absolute and noise-free as possible) to the best possible action to execute. As a game is divided into 6000 cycles this task has to be accomplished in time slot of 100 ms (the length of each cycle) .

Results

Teams reaching the top four

Titles per country

Teams

See also
 RoboCup
 RoboCup Simulation League
 RoboCup 3D Soccer Simulation League

External links
 RoboCup Soccer Simulation League
 The RoboCup Soccer Simulator
 RoboCup Soccer Simulator Wiki
 Team Assistant for 3D Visualisation
 RoboCup Historical Data Repository (Log Files, Team Binaries...)
 The WrightEagle Team
 The Helios Team
 The Oxsy Team
 The Brainstormers Team
 The CMUnited Team
 The Gliders Team
  The Alice Team

RoboCup
Robot soccer competitions